Juan Díaz (born September 17, 1983) is an American professional boxer who held the WBA (Unified) and WBA (Undisputed), IBF and WBO lightweight championships from 2007 to 2008 and the IBO lightweight championship from 2008 to 2009.

Amateur career
Diaz was 105–5 as an amateur, winning 13 National Gold Medals, two National Silver Medals and four World Championships. He thought he had qualified for the 2000 Mexican Olympic team but was informed he was too young to compete in Sydney. He did not want to wait four more years and turned pro.

Professional career

Lightweight
Díaz made his professional boxing debut at age 16 on June 23, 2000 with a first-round TKO victory over Rafael Ortiz. He won his first five fights by knockout.

On November 22, 2003, Díaz won the WBO youth lightweight title with a sixth-round TKO of journeyman Joel Pérez. He accumulated a record of 24–0, which included wins over title challengers Joel Perez and Francisco Lorenzo, before challenging for his first world title.

On July 17, 2004, Díaz defeated Mongolian Lakva Sim for the WBA lightweight title by unanimous decision. Díaz defended the title seven times.  On December 4, 2004, he defeated former two-time WBA lightweight champion Julien Lorcy by unanimous decision. In his second defense, he defeated Billy Irwin by 9th round tko. On April 8, 2006, he defended his title against undefeated José Miguel Cotto (brother of Miguel Cotto) with a unanimous decision victory. In his next fight, he defeated Randy Suico by 9th round tko. On November 14, 2006, Diaz successfully defended his title for the fifth time against Fernando Angulo of Ecuador by unanimous decision.

On April 28, 2007, Diaz was upgraded to super champion by the WBA, successfully defending his title against WBO champion Acelino Freitas by TKO after Freitas forfeited the fight before beginning the 9th round, unifying the WBO lightweight championship with the WBA (Super) lightweight title. The fight took place in Mashantucket, USA.

On October 13, 2007, Díaz unified a third title by defeating IBF Lightweight champion Julio Díaz in Chicago Illinois.

Diaz vs. Campbell
Nate Campbell defeated Diaz by split decision to become IBF, WBO, WBA Champion, on March 8, 2008 in Cancún, Mexico. This ended Diaz's undefeated streak of thirty-three wins.

Diaz's training is supervised by fitness guru Brian Caldwell of Houston Texas.

Diaz vs. Katsidis
Díaz (34–1, 17 KO's) won a 12-round split decision over Australia's previous WBO lightweight champion Michael Katsidis, (23–2, 20 KO's) on September 6, 2008. Diaz became the new IBO lightweight champion in the "No Retreat, No Surrender" main event fight at the Toyota Center in Houston, Texas. ringside judge Gale Van Hoy scored the fight 116–112 while Levi Martinez scored it 115–113, all for Diaz, but Judge Glen Hamada had it 115–113 for Katsidis.

Diaz vs. Marquez
On February 28, 2009, Juan Manuel Márquez defeated Diaz in the 9th round of a 12 round bout for the unified world lightweight title. In the opening rounds, Diaz appeared to be winning the fight, pinning Marquez on the ropes and occasionally staggering him with big left hands. In the eighth round, Diaz was cut over his eye by a Marquez punch, much like he was in the loss to Nate Campbell. After starting strong in the ninth round, Marquez's precision punching proved to be too much and Diaz was knocked down twice, bringing an end to the fight. This fight was named "Fight of the Year" for 2009 by Ring magazine and ESPN.com. A rematch was scheduled for July the 31st 2010. The fight was held live on Pay Per View and in U.S. Theaters around the country.

Brief foray at light welterweight

Diaz vs. Malignaggi I & II
On August 22, 2009, Diaz moved up in weight to challenge Paul Malignaggi for the vacant WBO NABO light welterweight title at a catch-weight of 138½ pounds in his hometown of Houston, Texas. Although the fight was competitive, Malignaggi appeared stronger in the latter rounds. Diaz was ultimately awarded a unanimous decision, however, the scores were controversial with one judge, Gale Von Hoy, scoring the fight 118–110 in Diaz's favor; another, Raul Caiz Sr., had it 115-113. Harold Lederman scored the fight 7 rounds to 5 for Malignaggi. On December 12, he had a rematch vs Paulie Malignaggi and lost a unanimous decision, all 3 judges scored it 116–111.

Return to lightweight

Diaz vs. Marquez II

Diaz fought Juan Manuel Márquez for the second time on July 31, 2010. Marquez won the fight via Unanimous Decision, 117–111, 118–110, 116–112

Comeback

Diaz vs. Pipino Cuevas Jr.
Declaring that he had "the fire back", the former unified lightweight titleholder Juan Díaz ended a 2½-year retirement on April 13 by fighting Gerardo "Pipino" Cuevas Jr. He was trained by Tim Knight of Louisville, Kentucky He won that bout, and went on fighting until 2016.

Personal life
He is a community activist who has been deputized as a Volunteer Voter Registrar for Harris County, Texas, and has also worked with the League of Women Voters of the Houston Area to promote full participation in civic life. Diaz's promotional company, Baby Bull LLC, partners with ESPN Deportes to produce the radio show The Baby Bull Show, which has featured guest appearances by fellow boxers. He also has a trucking company, JD Express Inc, with his brother Jose as partner.

Professional boxing record

References

External links

Juan Diaz profile at About.com

1983 births
International Boxing Federation champions
Living people
American boxers of Mexican descent
Boxers from Houston
University of Houston–Downtown alumni
World Boxing Association champions
World Boxing Organization champions
American male boxers
International Boxing Organization champions
Light-welterweight boxers